Agilok & Blubbo is the soundtrack album to the 1969 German film of the same name. It is notable in being one of the earliest recordings of the German rock band The Inner Space, who would soon become known under the name Can. Years after the film had fallen into obscurity, its soundtrack was eventually released in Spain in 2009. Along with the band's next soundtrack Kamasutra: Vollendung der Liebe, none of the material would be featured on Soundtracks, a 1970 compilation of songs the band had recorded for various film soundtracks. As a result the work remains a rarity. The tracks "Kamera Song" (sung by one of the films starring actresses Rosemarie Heinikel) and "Agilok and Blubbo" were released together as a single.

Track listing

Personnel 
 Irmin Schmidt – Vocals, Flute, Guitar, Music
 Jaki Liebezeit – drums
 Holger Czukay – bass
 Rosemarie Heinikel (credited as 'Rosy Rosy') – vocals on "Kamerasong"
 David C. Johnson – engineer
 Hans Wewerka – producer

References 

1968 debut albums
Can (band) albums